The following highways are numbered 313:

Canada
 Manitoba Provincial Road 313
 New Brunswick Route 313
 Prince Edward Island Route 313

China
 China National Highway 313

Costa Rica
 National Route 313

India
 National Highway 313 (India)

Japan
 Japan National Route 313

United States
  Arkansas Highway 313
  Connecticut Route 313
  County Road 313 (Gilchrist County, Florida)
  Georgia State Route 313
  Indiana State Road 313 (former)
  Kentucky Route 313
  Louisiana Highway 313
  Maryland Route 313
 Maryland Route 313A
  Minnesota State Highway 313
  Mississippi Highway 313
  Montana Secondary Highway 313
  New Mexico State Road 313
 New York:
  New York State Route 313
  County Route 313 (Erie County, New York)
  Ohio State Route 313
  Pennsylvania Route 313
  Tennessee State Route 313
 Texas:
  Texas State Highway 313 (former)
  Farm to Market Road 313
  Utah State Route 313
  Vermont Route 313
  Virginia State Route 313
 Virginia State Route 313 (former)
  Wyoming Highway 313

Other areas:
  Puerto Rico Highway 313
  U.S. Virgin Islands Highway 313